is a 2018 Japanese-language web television series directed by Mitsuno Michio and starring Akiyoshi Nakao, Tetsuji Tamayama and Hiroyuki Onoue. The plot revolves around simple-minded Hideaki Onishi as he meets series producer and Japanese comedy legend Sanma Akashiya, changes his name to Jimmy, and transforms into a comedy star. Jimmy's comedy leans heavily on slapstick and silly humour, against a backdrop of drama which drives the narrative forward.

It was ordered direct-to-series, and the first full season premiered on Netflix streaming on July 20, 2018.

Cast
 Akiyoshi Nakao as Jimmy Onishi
 Tetsuji Tamayama as Sanma Akashiya
 Hiroyuki Onoue as Shoji Murakami
 Seiji Rokkaku as Mr. Okure
 Shōhei Uno as Totzan
 Shintarō Hazama as Kanpei Hazama
 Yuta Kanai as Shinsuke Shimada
 Chizuru Ikewaki as Shinobu Otake
 Haruka Kinami as Kyōko Takamiya
 Kōichi Satō as Keisuke Miyake
 Takuya Kimura as a comedian (cameo)

Production

Keisuke Koide was originally cast as Sanma, but he was dropped from the project after his underage sex scandal.

Release
The full first season of Jimmy: The True Story of a True Idiot consisting of 9 episodes premiered on Netflix streaming on July 20, 2018.

References

External links

 
 
 

Japanese-language Netflix original programming